Francisco Javier García Quezada (born  4 April 1991) is a Paraguayan footballer who last played for Neftchi Baku.

Club career
On 17 January 2018, Neftchi Baku announced the signing of García on a one-year contract. On 25 June 2018, Neftchi Baku announced that they had terminated García's contract by mutual consent.

Career statistics

Club

References

1991 births
Living people
Paraguayan footballers
Association football forwards
Neftçi PFK players
Cerro Porteño players
Independiente F.B.C. footballers
Sportivo Luqueño players
Deportivo Capiatá players
Atlético Huila footballers
Club Nacional footballers